Raymondionyminae is a subfamily of snout and bark beetles in the family Brachyceridae. There are at least three genera and two described species in Raymondionyminae.

Genera
These three genera belong to the subfamily Raymondionyminae:
 Alaocybites Gilbert, 1956 i c g b
 Gilbertiola Osella, 1982 i g b
 Schizomicrus Casey, 1905 i c g b
Data sources: i = ITIS, c = Catalogue of Life, g = GBIF, b = Bugguide.net

References

Further reading

 
 
 
 
 
 
 
 
 
 
 
 
 

Brachyceridae